Stromboli may refer to:

Places
Stromboli (island) a volcanic island off the north coast of Sicily, Italy
Mount Stromboli, a volcano on the island

Food
 Stromboli (food), a type of turnover in the pizza family

Animals
 Stromboli (gastropod), a genus of sea snails

Film and television
 Stromboli (Disney), one of the villains in the 1940 Disney film Pinocchio
 Stromboli (1950 film), a 1950 Roberto Rossellini film starring Ingrid Bergman
 Stromboli (2022 film), a 2022 Dutch film released by Netflix

Literature
 Stromboli, a 2018 novel by Saskia Noort

Ships
 Stromboli-class replenishment oiler, oilers used by the Marina Militare since 1975
 HMS Strombolo, also HMS Stromboli, the name of eight ships of the Royal Navy
 USS Stromboli, the name given to three 19th-century US Navy ships
 USS Wassuc (1865), American naval ship renamed USS Stromboli
 Italian cruiser Stromboli, a cruiser of the Italian Regia Marina (Royal Navy) built in the 1880s
 Italian ship Stromboli

Other
 Nervures Stromboli, a French paraglider
 26761 Stromboli, an asteroid
 Stromboli, the last surviving locomotive of South Devon Railway's GWR Banking Class